Kaling Moyong is an Indian politician who is the Member of Legislative Assembly of BJP in Arunachal Pradesh.
He was elected from Pasighat East seat in the 2014 Arunachal Pradesh Legislative Assembly election, as he defeated Bosiram Siram the Former Education Minister of Arunachal Pradesh.

See also
Arunachal Pradesh Legislative Assembly

Bosiram siram

References

Bharatiya Janata Party politicians from Arunachal Pradesh
Arunachal Pradesh MLAs 2019–2024
Living people
People from Adi Community
People from Pasighat
Arunachal Pradesh MLAs 2014–2019
Year of birth missing (living people)